Barcelos is a city and a municipality in Braga District in the Minho Province, in the north of Portugal. The population in 2011 was 120,391, in an area of 378.90 km2. With 60 parishes, it is the municipality with the highest number of parishes in the country. It is one of the growing municipalities in the country,  and is well known by its textile and adobe industries, as well as its horseback riding events and "figurado" style of pottery, which are comical figurines with accentuated features of farmers, folk musicians, and nativity scene characters.

Barcelos is part of the UNESCO Creative Cities Network as a Crafts and Folk Art City.

History
Originally a Roman settlement, it expanded and became the seat of the First Duke of Bragança in the 15th century. The palace of the Dukes of Bragança was destroyed by an earthquake in 1755 and is now an open-air museum.

The town is on the Portuguese Way, a Christian pilgrimage route connecting the Camino de Santiago.  

Construction of the Barcelos Bridge, crossing the Cávado River, dates to 1325. The Bridge was deemed a National Monument in 1910.

Rooster

The town is closely associated with the Rooster of Barcelos, which often serves as a national symbol of Portugal.

One of the many legends of the rooster involves the town's long history along a pilgrimage route. The story involves a wealthy man throwing a grand party, which ended after the silver had gone missing. Among the guests was a pilgrim, who was accused of theft, and pleaded innocence before a judge. Unswayed by the pilgrim's claims, the judge sentenced the pilgrim to hang. As final protest, the pilgrim invoked divine intercession: the rooster being prepared for the judge's dinner would crow three times as proof of his innocence. As the execution approached, the judge at his dinner table watched the roasted bird miraculously crow three times. The judge quickly released the pilgrim, who would later return to Barcelos and commission a statue commemorating the divine providence.

Climate
Barcelos has a Mediterranean climate (Köppen: Csb) with warm summers and very wet, mild winters.

Parishes
Administratively, the municipality is divided into 61 civil parishes (freguesias):

 Abade de Neiva
 Aborim
 Adães
 Airó
 Aldreu
 Alheira e Igreja Nova
 Alvelos
 Alvito (São Pedro e São Martinho) e Couto
 Arcozelo
 Areias
 Areias de Vilar e Encourados
 Balugães
 Barcelinhos
 Barcelos, Vila Boa e Vila Frescainha (São Martinho e São Pedro)
 Barqueiros
 Cambeses
 Campo e Tamel (São Pedro Fins)
 Carapeços
 Carreira e Fonte Coberta
 Carvalhal
 Carvalhas
 Chorente, Góios, Courel, Pedra Furada e Gueral
 Cossourado
 Creixomil e Mariz
 Cristelo
 Durrães e Tregosa
 Fornelos
 Fragoso
 Galegos (Santa Maria)
 Galegos (São Martinho)
 Gamil e Midões
 Gilmonde
 Lama
 Lijó
 Macieira de Rates
 Manhente
 Martim
 Milhazes, Vilar de Figos e Faria
 Moure
 Negreiros e Chavão
 Oliveira
 Palme
 Panque
 Paradela
 Pereira
 Perelhal
 Pousa
 Quintiães e Aguiar
 Remelhe
 Rio Covo (Santa Eugénia)
 Roriz
 Sequeade e Bastuço (São João e Santo Estêvão)
 Silva
 Silveiros e Rio Covo (Santa Eulália)
 Tamel (Santa Leocádia) e Vilar do Monte
 Tamel (São Veríssimo)
 Ucha
 Várzea
 Viatodos, Grimancelos, Minhotães e Monte de Fralães
 Vila Cova e Feitos
 Vila Seca

Notable citizens

Paio Peres Correia (ca.1205-1275) a Reconquista warrior from Monte de Fralães. 
 João Garcia de Guilhade, (PT Wiki) (1239-1288) a famous trobadour from Milhazes.
Pedro Afonso, Count of Barcelos (1289–1350) illegitimate son of King Denis of Portugal and the third Count of Barcelos.
 Isabel of Barcelos (1402–1466) a lady of the Portuguese nobility 
Lourenço de Almeida (ca.1480-1508) an explorer from Martim and military commander.
Gaspar de Faria (ca.1520 — 1576), was the 6th Bishop of Angra, from 1571 and 1576.
Francisco de Sá Carneiro (1934–1980) Prime Minister of Portugal; his paternal family were from Barcelos.
 António Pires de Lima, (PT Wiki) (1936-2017) a lawyer from Barcelos.
Gisela João (born 1983) a Portuguese fado singer.
Renata Gomes (born 1985) a cardiovascular specialist and academic

Sport 
Dito (1962–2020) a footballer with 383 club caps and 17 with Portugal
Capucho (born 1972) a former footballer with 410 club caps and 34 with Portugal
Bruno Magalhães (born 1982) a former footballer with 443 club caps
Hugo Viana (born 1983) a footballer with 321 club caps and 29 with Portugal
Nélson Oliveira (born 1991) a footballer with over 270 club caps and 17 with Portugal

Sport
Barcelos is home to Gil Vicente Futebol Clube (football) and Óquei Clube de Barcelos (rink hockey).

Twin Cities

 Vierzon, France
 Pontevedra, Spain
 São Domingos, Cape Verde
 El Jadida, Morocco
 Recife, Brazil
 Svishtov, Bulgaria

References

 
Cities in Portugal